Mauli  is a village in Phagwara tehsil in Kapurthala district of Punjab State, India. The village is administrated by a Sarpanch who is an elected representative of village.

Transport
Phagwara and Mauli Halt railway station are the nearest railway stations to Mauli; Jalandhar City railway station is 26 km away.  The village is 121 km away from Sri Guru Ram Dass Jee International Airport in Amritsar and Sahnewal Airport in Ludhiana is located 34 km away. Phagwara, Jandiala, Jalandhar, Phillaur are the nearby cities.

References

External links
  Villages in Kapurthala
 Kapurthala Villages List

Villages in Kapurthala district